Anabella Castro Sierra is a Colombian model, social communicator and a beauty pageant titleholder. She was appointed as Miss International Colombia 2018 by Miss Colombia pageant (Concurso Nacional de Belleza). She represented Colombia at Miss International 2018 pageant and became the 4th Runner-up.

Early life 
Anabella Castro was born on November 10, 1996 in Valledupar, Cesar. Her father is Ciro Castro Álvarez and her mother is Rosa Lila Sierra Vergara. She studied social communication and Journalism at University of La Sabana in Chía, Cundinamarca. She speaks Spanish and English.

Pageantry

Señorita Colombia 2017 
Anabella represented the Cesar Department at the national beauty contest, Señorita Colombia 2017 held on 20 March 2017. She ended up placing in the Top 10 finalists and also bagged the 'Elegancia Prímatela' and 'Reina de la Policía' titles.

Miss International 2018 
Anabella was appointed as Miss Colombia International 2018 by Miss Colombia pageant (Concurso Nacional de Belleza) on 29 June 2018. She then represented Colombia at the Miss International 2018 pageant held in Tokyo, Japan on November 9, 2018, where she became the 4th Runner-up making Colombia's placement after three years of consecutive unplacement through 2015 to 2017.

References

External links

Living people
1997 births
Miss Colombia winners
Colombian female models
Colombian beauty pageant winners
Miss International 2018 delegates
University of La Sabana alumni